Inwood is a station on the Long Island Rail Road's Far Rockaway Branch in Inwood, New York. The station is located at Doughty Boulevard and Brunswick Avenue (formerly Foote Avenue).

History
In the 19th century, Inwood and the LIRR station located within it were named "Westville." The name of the community was changed to "Inwood" on February 25, 1889, and the station followed suit. Between December 3, 1911, and 1956, the station only had sheltered-sheds.

Station layout
This station has two high-level side platforms, each four cars long. It currently exists as little more than two high-level sheltered side platforms, both of which run beneath the underpass for the Nassau Expressway (NY-878).

References

External links 

 Station from Doughty Boulevard entrance from Google Maps Street View
 Platforms from Google Maps Street View

Five Towns
Long Island Rail Road stations in Nassau County, New York